Youngman is an English-language last name which is derived from Old English geong mann "young man" via Middle English yunge man "young servant" and originally was the rank of a servant in a noble household.

Notable people with the surname include:
 
 Annie Marie Youngman (1860–1919), British painter
 Hennessy Youngman, persona invented and performed by Jayson Musson
 Henny Youngman (1906–1998), American comedian and violinist
 Henry Youngman (1865–1936), professional baseball player
 Jerome T. Youngman (born 1951), American rock singer, songwriter and record producer
 Joseph Youngman (born 1982), American music producer
 Kate Youngman (1841–1910), American missionary 
 Nan Youngman (1906–1995), English painter and educationalist
 Stuart Youngman (born 1965), English former footballer
 William S. Youngman (1872–1934), American politician

References

Surnames from nicknames
English-language surnames